The 1925 SIAA men's basketball tournament took place February 25–February 28, 1925. The Mercer Bears won their third Southern Intercollegiate Athletic Association title, led by head coach Tink Gillam.

Bracket

* Overtime game

Consolation game

Championship

See also
List of SIAA basketball champions

References

Tournament
Southern Intercollegiate men's basketball tournament